Fudaj (also Romanized as Fūdāj and Foodaj; also known as Pūdāj and Fūdāch) is a village in Baqeran Rural District, in the Central District of Birjand County, South Khorasan Province, Iran. At the 2006 census, its population was 52, in 16 families.

References 

Populated places in Birjand County